Jacy Reese Anthis (born December 16, 1992), who has written under the name Jacy Reese, is an American social scientist, writer and co-founder of the Sentience Institute with Kelly Witwicki. He previously worked as a Senior Fellow at Sentience Politics, and before that at Animal Charity Evaluators as chair of the board of directors, then as a full-time researcher.

Anthis's research focuses on effective altruism, anti-speciesism, and plant-based and cellular agriculture. He was recognized as one of Vices "Humans of the Year" in December 2017, along with Witwicki. His book, The End of Animal Farming (2018), argues that animal farming will end by 2100.

Education
Anthis attended the University of Texas at Austin, graduating with a Bachelor of Arts and Science in neuroscience in 2015. In 2020, he enrolled in the Ph.D. program in Sociology at the University of Chicago.

Career 
Before finishing his undergraduate degree, Anthis worked on the Animal Charity Evaluators (ACE) Board of Directors; he joined them as a full-time researcher after graduation. ACE is an organization within the effective altruism movement that evaluates and compares various animal charities based on their cost-effectiveness and transparency, particularly those that are tackling factory farming. While at ACE, Anthis published an article that addressed the issue of wild animal suffering, arguing that humans should act on behalf of wild animals to alleviate their suffering if it can be done safely and effectively. His 2015 Vox article on the topic was criticized by writers who argued that humanity should not intervene or that it should instead focus on helping domestic animals.

Sentience Institute 

After a year and a half at Animal Charity Evaluators, Anthis briefly worked with Sentience Politics, a project of the Effective Altruism Foundation. Sentience Politics then split into two organizations, one of which was the Sentience Institute, co-founded by Anthis and Kelly Witwicki in June 2017.

The End of Animal Farming 

In The End of Animal Farming, Anthis "outlines an evidence-based roadmap to a humane, ethical, efficient food system where slaughterhouses are obsolete". Anthis wrote this book from the perspective of effective altruism because there is already much content explaining the problems of animal agriculture, but he perceived a need for a book to guide the "farmed animal movement" towards its long-term goal. Near the end of the book, Anthis concludes that, "if I had to speculate, I would say by 2100 all forms of animal farming will seem outdated and barbaric."

Selected works
(2018). The End of Animal Farming: How Scientists, Entrepreneurs, and Activists Are Building an Animal-Free Food System. Boston: Beacon Press

See also
 List of animal rights advocates

References

External links

 
 

1992 births
Living people
21st-century American non-fiction writers
American animal rights scholars
American food writers
American science writers
American social scientists
American veganism activists
People associated with effective altruism
People from Huntsville, Texas
Sentientists
University of Texas at Austin alumni
Writers from Texas